The cuneiform sign at, is a common-use sign of the Amarna letters, the Epic of Gilgamesh, and other cuneiform texts (for example Hittite texts). It has secondary uses in the Amarna letters for "ad".

Linguistically, it has the alphabetical usage in texts for a, (also the 4 vowels, a, e, i, u), and t, and d.

Epic of Gilgamesh usage
The at sign usage in the Epic of Gilgamesh is as follows: (ad, 17 times, at, 107, aṭ, 15, and AD, 15 times).

Gallery

References

 Parpola, 1971. The Standard Babylonian Epic of Gilgamesh, Parpola, Simo, Neo-Assyrian Text Corpus Project, c 1997, Tablet I thru Tablet XII, Index of Names, Sign List,

Cuneiform signs